Virendra Saxena (born 23 November 1951) is an Indian actor who works in Hindi theatre, film, and television. He is an alumnus of the National School of Drama. Saxena is known for his character roles as well as his unique voice. He has acted in more than 80 Indian films and a few English-language films such as White Rainbow, Cotton Mary and In Custody. Prominent TV serials he has acted in include Ajnabi and Jassi Jaissi Koi Nahin.

Filmography

Films

Massey Sahib (1985)
Khamosh (1985)
Tamas (1986)
Aashiqui (1990)
Narasimha (1991)
Dil Hai Ki Manta Nahin (1991)
Vishnu-Devaa (1991)
Dharavi (1992)
Karamati Coat (1993)
Angaar (1992)
Suraj Ka Satvan Ghoda (1993)
Kabhi Haan Kabhi Naa (1993)
Damini (1993)
Aaina (1993)
Tejasvini (1994)
Tarpan (1994)
In Custody (1994)
Amravati ki kathiya(1994)
Naaraaz (1994)
English, August (1994)
Ram (1996)
Tunnu Ki Tina (1997)
Ziddi (1997)
Pardesi Babu (1998)
Heeralal Pannalal (1999)
Arjun Pandit (1999)
Split Wide Open (1999)
Shool (1999)
Cotton Mary (1999)
Bichhoo (2000)
Aks (2001)
Maya (2001)
Kaaboo (2002)
Ghaav (2002)
Saathiya (2002)
Aapko Pehle Bhi Kahin Dekha Hai (2003) 
Ek Hindustani (2003)
Jaal: The Trap (2003)
Raghu Romeo (2003)
Samay (2003)
Dhoop (2003)
Fun2shh (2003)
Rudraksh (2004)
Kismat (2004)
Bardaasht (2004)
Vanity Fair (2004)
Bhola in Bollywood (2005)
Vaada (2005)
White Rainbow (2005)
Bunty Aur Babli (2005)
Sarkar (2005)
Ek Chalis Ki Last Local (2007)
Ram Gopal Varma Ki Aag (2007)
A Wednesday (2008)
Yeh Mera India (2009)
The Stoneman Murders (2009)
Housefull 2 (2012)
Bheja fry 2
The Mechanic
Ata Pata Lapatta
Bubble Gum 
Shagird 
Tera Kya Hoga Johnny
Road, Movie 
Dekh Bhai Dekh
Sankat City
Ek Se Bure Do
Chal Chala Chal
Say Salaam India
Krishna 
Karamati Coat
Vishnu-Devaa
Jigariyaa (2014)
Mr Joe B. Carvalho (2014)
Naam Shabana (2017)
Mantostaan (2017)
Lucknow Central (2017)
Sonu Ke Titu Ki Sweety (2018)
Super 30 (2019)
Photograph (2019)
Bombay Rose (2019)
Commando 3 (2019)
Baaghi 3 (2020)
Chehre (2021)
Bheed (2023)

Television

References

External links
 

Living people
Indian male film actors
Indian male television actors
People from Mathura
Male actors in Hindi cinema
National School of Drama alumni
Male actors from Uttar Pradesh
20th-century Indian male actors
21st-century Indian male actors
Male actors in Hindi television
1960 births